Rivenhall is a village and civil parish near Witham in the Braintree district in the English county of Essex. It is near the small settlement of Rivenhall End.

It has a primary school called Rivenhall Church of England School. For transport there is the busy A12 nearby and Witham railway station.

The Anglo-Saxon church of St. Mary and All Saints and the nearby manor house have been in continuous human use sine their origins as parts of a  Roman villa. The church is a grade I listed building.

It also had a Royal Air Force airfield called RAF Station Rivenhall.

References 

 http://www.rivenhallparishcouncil.net

Villages in Essex
Civil parishes in Essex
Braintree District